Statistics of Swedish football Division 3 for the 2008 season.

League standings

Norra Norrland 2008

Mellersta Norrland 2008

Södra Norrland 2008

Gestrike/Hammarby IF      Withdrew

Norra Svealand 2008

Västra Svealand 2008

Södra Svealand 2008

Nordöstra Götaland 2008

Nordvästra Götaland 2008

Mellersta Götaland 2008

Sydöstra Götaland 2008

Sydvästra Götaland 2008

Södra Götaland 2008

Footnotes

References 

Swedish Football Division 3 seasons
5
Sweden
Sweden